Gaviota (Spanish for "Seagull") is an unincorporated community in Santa Barbara County, California on the Gaviota Coast about  west of Santa Barbara and  south of Buellton.

Approximately 70 people live in Gaviota. The town is south and east of Gaviota State Park. The road to Hollister Ranch, the large private land holding along the coast between Gaviota and Point Conception, connects with U.S. 101 just west of Gaviota, at the turnoff to Gaviota State Park.

Industries include organic farming, ranching, and woodworking.  Free range cattle can be seen roaming and grazing throughout the area.  Gaviota is also home to a marine mammal rehabilitation center named The Channel Islands Marine & Wildlife Institute (CIMWI.org) which opened in 2006 at the historic Vista Del Mar School grounds.

Gaviota was once the location of the Gaviota Marine Terminal, which is currently being decommissioned and abandoned, with intent to become public open space.  On the mountain side of the freeway is the Gaviota Oil Heating Facility, also known as the "Gaviota Gas Plant", built by Chevron Corp. and currently owned by Plains Exploration & Production Company (PXP); this facility is being reconfigured and partially abandoned.  The former purpose of the facility was to heat and process the heavy crude oil produced offshore so that it could flow through the All American Pipeline to refineries in the Bakersfield area.

Gaviota Coast
The Gaviota Coast remains largely undeveloped and is the longest remaining rural coastline in southern California. In 2016, the twenty-one miles of Highway 101 that runs through the Gaviota Coast, bounded by the City of Goleta’s western boundary and Las Cruces where Route 1, was declared a State Scenic Highway. The preservation of this area is the subject of "The Twenty," a film by The Surfrider Foundation.

Gaviota tarweed, a rare and endangered subspecies (subsp. villosa) of Deinandra increscens endemic to Santa Barbara County, is found here.

History
The first European land exploration of Alta California, the Spanish Portolà expedition, camped at Gaviota Creek on August 24, 1769 (on its way north). On the return journey to San Diego, the party again stopped there on January 6, 1770. Franciscan missionary Juan Crespi noted in his diary, "I called this place San Luis Rey, and the soldiers know it as La Gaviota, because they killed a seagull there." Gaviota is the Spanish word for "seagull".

See also
 Gaviota Tunnel
 Gaviota Peak
 Hollister Ranch

References

Unincorporated communities in Santa Barbara County, California
Unincorporated communities in California